Sandra Adams Dodd (born July 24, 1953, Augusta, Georgia) is an unschooling advocate. Her articles have been published in homeschooling journals (particularly, Home Education Magazine), in her books "Moving a Puddle" and "Sandra Dodd's Big Book of Unschooling", and are available on her personal website. Articles she has written have been translated into several languages, and her "Public School On Your Own Terms" was featured in "The Homeschooling Book of Answers". She was frequently invited to speak at homeschooling and unschooling conferences and announced her retirement from conferences in 2017.

Dodd grew up in Española, New Mexico. When she was 14, Dodd (then Adams) received a promo copy of David Bowie's first album, David Bowie. Impressed by his lyrics and music, she wrote him a fan letter. Bowie responded, "... a few moments ago I was handed my very first American fan letter - and it was from you. I was so pleased that I had to sit down and type an immediate  reply, even though Ken is shouting at me to get on with a script he badly needs."

She attended the University of New Mexico beginning in the fall of 1970 at age 17.  She graduated at 20 with a major in English and minors in psychology and anthropology.

Dodd was always interested in education and learning. She learned about the open classroom philosophy, free schools such as Summerhill School, and read the writings of John Caldwell Holt. She was a junior high school English teacher but chose to apply the progressive learning approaches she learned about in college when she had her own children. None of her three children have ever been to school and all three have been radically unschooled.

Dodd has been an active member of the Society for Creative Anachronism for most of her adult life since joining in the 1970s.

On her website, Dodd says:

References

External links
Sandra Dodd official website with biography and speaking schedule
Interview With Sandra Dodd Home Education Magazine
Improving Unschooling Radio Free School interview with Sandra Dodd
Living Unschooling With Sandra Dodd (pdf) Life Learning Magazine
Sandra Dodd Describes Unschooling Successful Homeschooling

1953 births
Living people
American education writers
American non-fiction writers
Schoolteachers from New Mexico
American women educators
Advocates of unschooling and homeschooling
University of New Mexico alumni
People from Española, New Mexico
21st-century American women